The Tyson 250 is a future NASCAR Craftsman Truck Series race that will be held at the reopened North Wilkesboro Speedway in North Carolina starting in 2023. The race will be held in May on the same weekend as the NASCAR Cup Series All-Star Race which was moved to the track in 2023. The Truck Series previously raced at the track twice before it closed in 1996.

History
In 1995, the race was the Lowe's 150 and the race in 1996 was the Lowe's 250.

The first Truck Series race at North Wilkesboro in 1995 featured the return of Cup Series driver Ernie Irvan, who was not able to race for over a year after suffering an injury in the 1994 Cup Series race at Michigan in August. He entered the race to get re-acclimated to racing so he would be better prepared for the Cup Series race on the same weekend. Mike Bliss would win that race. It was his first Truck Series win.

The 1996 race was lengthened from 150 laps to 250 laps. Full-time Cup Series driver Mark Martin would win the race. It was his first Truck Series win. After this race, he would not enter another Truck Series race until the 2005 season-finale at Homestead-Miami Speedway.

On February 17, 2023, Tyson Foods was announced as the title sponsor for the 2023 race. The company was previously the title sponsor of the fall Cup Series race at North Wilkesboro from 1990 to 1996. After the track closed and became abandoned, their logo remained on the track's scoring pylon.

Past winners

Manufacturer wins

References

External links 
 

NASCAR Truck Series races
NASCAR races at North Wilkesboro Speedway
Annual sporting events in the United States
1995 establishments in North Carolina
2023 establishments in North Carolina